Gelam Kabud or Golom Kabud may refer to:

Golom Kabud, Kermanshah
Gelam Kabud, Lorestan